The 2021–22 Brisbane Heat season was the eleventh in the club's history. The team was coached by Darren Lehmann and captained by Chris Lynn, they competed in the BBL's 2021–22 season.

Standings

Regular season

Squad information

The current squad of the Brisbane Heat for the 2021–22 Big Bash League season as of 23 November 2021.
 Players with international caps are listed in bold.

Notes

References 

Brisbane Heat seasons
2021–22 Australian cricket season